Dwaraka Nagar is a locality in Visakhapatnam of Andhra Pradesh, India. It is one of the main commercial areas in the city. It is a hub for many shopping malls, educational institutes, hotels, lodges, food courts, restaurants, coaching centers etc.

Commerce
It is the major commercial area in Visakhapatnam. It is the business center for all types of outlets and offices.

Transport 
Dwaraka Nagar is the Bus Transportation hub of Visakhapatnam. Central bus station of the city, Dwaraka bus station is located in this neighborhood.

Gallery

References

Neighbourhoods in Visakhapatnam
Shopping districts and streets in India